Anna Lee "Boots" Carroll (October 7, 1930 – April 30, 2017) was an American actress, based in Alabama, whose career included dozens of theaters productions, as well as several movies and television shows. Carroll was best known for her portrayal of Nurse Bradford in the 1968 film, The Heart Is a Lonely Hunter, alongside Alan Arkin. Arkin plays a deaf-mute in the film, while Carroll's Nurse Bradford provides the dialogue for his character in their mutual scenes. Carroll's additional film roles included Not of This Earth in 1957 and Marlowe in 1969.

Early life 
Carroll was born in Birmingham, Alabama, on October 7, 1930, as the sole child of Frederick L. "Peck" and Ella Corrine "E.C." Carroll.

Career 
She began her professional acting career in 1952 as a cast member for theater director James Hatcher's Town and Gown Theater, a Birmingham theater first opened in 1950. She rose to become one of the leading stage actresses in Alabama, starring in dozens of plays and traveling productions from 1952 until her final role in 2015. In addition to the Town and Gown, she appeared in productions by the Virginia Samford Theatre, Birmingham Festival Theatre and the Terrific New Theatre. She also joined the cast of touring theater companies, including Wit's Other End and the Seasoned Performers. Carroll frequently co-starred with actress and writer Fannie Flagg, author of Fried Green Tomatoes at the Whistle Stop Cafe; the two had first met in 1960 while both were acting at the Town and Gown.

Carroll also performed in the film Fear No More (1961).

Personal life 
Carroll performed consistently until 2012, when she fell from the stage during a dress rehearsal at the Virginia Samford Theatre in Birmingham. She was taken to the hospital, where doctors discovered a tumor unrelated to her accident. She recovered and returned to acting. She performed her final theater role in 2015. Carroll underwent a second surgery in 2016, while declining health sidelined her performances.

Carroll died on April 30, 2017, at the age of 86. She was buried in Elmwood Cemetery in her native Birmingham.

Filmography

Film

Television

References

External links

1930 births
2017 deaths
American film actresses
American stage actresses
American television actresses
Actresses from Birmingham, Alabama
Burials at Elmwood Cemetery (Birmingham, Alabama)
21st-century American women